The striped treeshrew (Tupaia dorsalis) is a treeshrew species within the Tupaiidae.
It is endemic to Borneo and known only from a few individuals in Sabah, Sarawak, Brunei and Kalimantan.

References

Treeshrews
Mammals of Indonesia
Mammals of Malaysia
Mammals of Borneo
Endemic fauna of Borneo
Mammals described in 1857
Taxonomy articles created by Polbot